A writing process describes a sequence of physical and mental actions that people take as they produce any kind of text. These actions nearly universally involve tools for physical or digital inscription: e.g., chisels, pencils, brushes, chalk, dies, keyboards, touchscreens, etc.; these tools all have particular affordances that shape writers' processes. Writing processes are highly individuated and task-specific; they often involve other kinds of activities that are not usually thought of as writing per se (talking, drawing, reading, browsing, etc.).

Historical and contemporary perspectives 
In 1972, Donald M. Murray published a brief manifesto titled "Teach Writing as a Process Not Product", in which he argued that English teachers' conventional training in literary criticism caused them to hold students' work to unhelpful standards of highly polished "finished writing". Teachers, he explained, ought to focus less on correcting students' written products and focus more on involving students in "discovery through language", which Murray believed for "most writers most of the time" involved a process: i.e., stages of "pre-writing, writing and rewriting". Though Murray was not alone in advocating process-based instruction, this manifesto is regarded as a landmark vocalization of the differences between process and product orientations in the teaching of writing. Within a decade, Maxine Hairston was to observe that the teaching of writing had undergone a transformation in moving from a focus on written products to writing processes.

These categories were theorized more fully in subsequent scholarship. For example, pre-writing was defined by Project English experimental researcher D. Gordon Rohman as the "sort of 'thinking' [that] precedes writing" and the "activity of mind which brings forth and develops ideas, plans, designs". According to Rohman, writing begins "at the point where the 'writing idea' is ready for the words and the page". Even today, much "process-based" teaching has continued to broadly conceptualize writing processes along these three phases. Some have linked this three-stage process to the five canons of rhetoric: pre-writing to invention and arrangement, writing to style, and revising to delivery and sometimes memory.

While contemporary research on writing processes still accepts that some kind of process is necessarily involved in producing any written text, it now collectively endorses "the fundamental idea that no codifiable or generalizable writing process exists or could exist".  In this view, "writing processes are historically dynamic – not psychic states, cognitive routines, or neutral social relationships". In terms of "pre-writing", for instance, writing processes often begin long before any visible documentable work or easily categorizable steps are observable. From the contemporary perspective of composition studies, it is thus inaccurate to assume that any authentic writing process (i.e., one not contrived as part of a school assignment or laboratory setting) necessarily involves a linear sequence of "stages". Rather different kinds of activities emerge as overlapping parts of a complex whole or parts of a repeating process that can be repeated multiple times throughout anyone's process of composing a particular document. For example, writers routinely discover that editorial changes trigger brainstorming and a change of purpose; that drafting is temporarily interrupted to correct a misspelling; or that the boundary between pre-writing and drafting is less than obvious.

Approaches to process 
Writing process has been described by composition scholars in a variety of ways with attention to "developmental, expressive, and social" elements.

Cognitive process theory of writing (Flower–Hayes model)

Overview of cognitive model 
Linda Flower ( a composition theorist known in the field of cognitive rhetoric) and John R. Hayes extended Bitzer's rhetorical situation and developed a set of heuristics that framed the writing process as a series of rhetorical problems to be solved. The heuristics focus on the generation and the structuring of ideas. Writers should choose goals with built-in guidelines that lead their content into certain directions. While generating ideas, four viable techniques are to write ideas without editing or filtering, to play out scenarios discussing the topic, to generate analogies, and to rest on ideas. When a writer is looking to push their ideas they should try to find cue words to tie complex ideas together, to teach the ideas to another person, to tree ideas into classifications of organization, and to read their own writing as if they'd never seen it before. The last tool is to write for a specific audience by finding common ground with them.

Flower and Hayes further developed the cognitive model in "The Cognition of Discovery" by observing writers in order to learn how they generate meaning. They outlined the rhetorical problem as a list of what a writer may address or consider. In doing so, they created a model for the rhetorical problem that can be split up into two main categories: The rhetorical situation and the writer's own goals. The rhetorical situation is what motivates a writer to create ideas. The writer's own goals are what guide how ideas are formed. The rhetorical situation is further split into the purpose of the writing, and who will be reading it. The writer's own goals are split into how the reader is affected, the persona the writer uses, the meaning the writer can create, and implementation of writing conventions.

They came to three results from their study, which suggests that good writers envelop the three following characteristics when solving their rhetorical problems:

 Good writers respond to all of the rhetorical problems
 Good writers build their problem representation by creating a particularly rich network of goals for affecting a reader; and
 Good writers represent the problem not only in more breadth but in more depth.

Flower and Hayes suggest that composition instructors need to consider showing students how "to explore and define their own problems, even within the constraints of an assignment". They believe that "writers discover what they want to do by insistently, energetically exploring the entire problem before them and building for themselves a unique image of the problem they want to solve."

Historical approaches to composition and process 

A historical response to process is concerned primarily with the manner in which writing has been shaped and governed by historical and social forces. These forces are dynamic and contextual, and therefore render any static iteration of process unlikely.

Notable scholars that have conducted this type of inquiry include media theorists such as Marshall McLuhan, Walter Ong, Gregory Ulmer, and Cynthia Selfe. Much of McLuhan's work, for example, centered around the impact of written language on oral cultures, degrees to which various media are accessible and interactive, and the ways in which electronic media determine communication patterns. His evaluation of technology as a shaper of human societies and psyches indicates a strong connection between historical forces and literacy practices.

Criticism of cognitive model 
Patricia Bizzell ( a professor with a PhD in English and former president of Rhetoric Society of America) argues that even though educators may have an understanding of "how" the writing process occurs, educators shouldn't assume that this knowledge can answer the question "about 'why' the writer makes certain choices in certain situations", since writing is always situated within a discourse community. She discusses how the Flower and Hayes model relies on what is called the process of "translating ideas into visible language". This process occurs when students "treat written English as a set of containers into which we pour meaning". Bizzell contends that this process "remains the emptiest box" in the cognitive process model, since it de-contextualizes the original context of the written text, negating the original. She argues, "Writing does not so much contribute to thinking as provide an occasion for thinking."

Social model of writing process 
"The aim of collaborative learning helps students to find more control in their learning situation. 

The social model of writing relies on the relationship between the writers and readers for the purpose of creating meaning. "Writers seldom write exactly what they mean and readers seldom interpret a writer's words exactly as the writer intended."  

Even grammar has a social turn in writing: "It may be that to fully account for the contempt that some errors of usage arouse, we will have to understand better than we do the relationship between language, order, and those deep psychic forces that perceived linguistic violations seem to arouse in otherwise amiable people". 
So one can't simply say a thing is right or wrong. There is a difference of degrees attributed to social forces.

Expressivist process theory of writing 

According to the expressivist theory, the process of writing is centered on the writer's transformation. This involves the writer changing in the sense that voice and identity are established and the writer has a sense of his or her self. Writing is a process used to create meaning, according to expressivist pedagogy. An author’s sense of self is emphasized for bringing social change. This theory became popular in the late 1960s and early 1970s. According to Richard Fulkerson's article "Four Philosophies of Composition", the focus of expressivism is for writers to have "... an interesting, credible, honest, and personal voice". Moreover, proponents of the expressivist process view this theory as a way for students to become fulfilled and healthy both emotionally and mentally. Those who teach this process often focus on journaling and other classroom activities to focus on student self-discovery and at times, low-stakes writing. Prominent figures in the field include John Dixon, Ken Macrorie, Lou Kelly, Donald C. Stewart and Peter Elbow.

Autistic autobiographies 

As appealing as document sharing may be for students with autism in particular, being able to contextualize one's life story in the context of their disability may prove the most powerful expression of the writing process overall. Rose illustrates that creating narrative identity in a conventional sense is quite difficult for autistic students because of their challenges with interpersonal communication. The narratives of autistic students can sometimes be troubling to neurotypical peers with whom they share their work, as Rose notes in quoting autistic autobiographer Dawn Price-Hughes, "Sometimes reaching out and communicating isn't easy–it can bring sadness and regret. Some of my family and friends, after reading the manuscript for this book, were deeply saddened to learn how I experienced my world."

Rose points to the well-known work of Temple Grandin and Donna Williams as examples of autistic autobiographies and analogizes toward the usefulness of women's autobiographies championed by Susan Stanford Friedman to show women's inter-connectivity, suggesting the same can be learned through autistic autobiographies. She writes that such works can minimize the "pathologization (The treatment of a health or behaviour condition as if it were a medical condition) of difference" which can easily occur between autistic students and neurotypical peers can be broken down by such autobiographies. As Rose directly says, "I argue here that awareness of the relationality of autistic life writing, and the recognition of its corollary status as testimonio and attention to the material relations of the production of these texts is particularly useful in assessing their social significance."

From a rhetorical perspective the use for students with disabilities (not just autistic students) seems to be promising. It would appear to foster a sense of a community among students with disabilities and helping these voices be brought in from the margins similarly to the way Mike Rose refers to students from disadvantaged backgrounds and their needs in Lives on the Boundary.

Editing 

Editing operates on several levels. The lowest level, often called line editing, is the stage in the writing process where the writer makes changes in the text to correct errors—such as spelling, subject/verb agreement, verb tense consistency, point of view consistency, mechanical errors, word choice, and word usage (there, their or they're)—and fine-tune his or her style. Having revised the draft for content, the writer's task is now to make changes that will improve the communication with the reader. Depending on the genre, the writer may choose to adhere to the conventions of Standard English. These conventions are still being developed and the rulings on controversial issues may vary depending on the source. For example, Strunk and White's Elements of Style, first published in 1918, is considered by some to be an authority on stylistic conventions, but has been derided by linguist Geoffrey K. Pullum as "stupid". An electronic resource is the Purdue Online Writing Lab (OWL), where writers may search a specific issue to find an explanation of grammatical and mechanical conventions.

See also 
 Argument mapping
 Composition (language)
 Style guide
 Writer's block
 Writing style

References

Selected readings 
 Berthoff, Ann. The Making of Meaning: Metaphors, Models and Maxims for Writing Teachers. Boynton/Cook Publishers, 1981.
 Brand, Alice G. "The Why of Cognition: Emotion and the Writing Process". CCC 38.4 (1987): 436–443.
 Bruffee, Kenneth A. "Collaborative Learning and the 'Conversation of Mankind'" College English 46.7 (1984): 635–652.
 Elbow, Peter. Writing without Teachers 2nd ed. Oxford University Press, USA, 1998.
 
 
 
 Guffey, Rhodes and Rogin. "Business Communication: Process and Product". Third Brief Canadian Edition. Thomson-Nelson, 2010.
 Murray, Donald. Writing to Learn 8th ed. Wadsworth. 2004
 Pattison, Darcy. Paper Lightning: Prewriting Activities to Spark Creativity and Help Students Write Effectively. Cottonwood Press, 2008.
 Sommers, Nancy. "Revision Strategies of Student Writers and Experienced Adult Writers". CCC 31.4 (1980): 378–388.

External links 

 Purdue Online Writing Lab
 Power writing Tips on saying loads with few words
 Resources for Writers, from MIT's Online Writing and Communication Center

Pedagogy
Composition (language)